Johann Heinrich Bartholomäus Walter or Walther (1734–1802) was a Baltic German architect, working in Tartu where he produced a number of buildings including Tartu Town Hall.

Life
Walter was born in Rostock in 1734. He moved to Tartu in what is now Estonia where he was a master builder. Following the Great Fire of Tartu in 1775 he designed Tartu Town Hall and the Von Bock House in the centre of the city.

Walter was buried in Tartu on 2 April 1802.

References

1734 births
1802 deaths
People from Rostock